George Harris, 1st Baron Harris GCB (18 March 1746 – 19 May 1829) was a British soldier.

Military career
Harris was the son of the Reverend George Harris, curate of Brasted, Kent. He was educated at Westminster School and at the Royal Military Academy, Woolwich.  He was commissioned to the Royal Artillery in 1760, transferring as an ensign in the 5th foot (Northumberland Fusiliers) in 1762. Three years later he became lieutenant, and in 1771 captain. His first active service was in the American War of Independence, in which he served at Lexington, Bunker Hill (where he was severely wounded) and in every engagement of Howe's army except one up to November 1778.

By this time he had obtained his majority, and his next service was under Major-General Medows at St. Lucia in 1778–1779, after which his regiment served as marines in Rodney's fleet. Later in 1779 he was for a time a prisoner of war. Shortly before his promotion to lieutenant-colonel in his regiment (1780) he married Anne Carteret Dickson. After commanding the 5th in Ireland for some years, he exchanged and went with General Medows to Bombay, and served with that officer in India until 1792, taking part in various battles and engagements, notably Lord Cornwallis's attack on Seringapatam in the Third Anglo-Mysore War.

In 1794, after a short period of home service, he was again in India. In the same year he became major-general, and in 1797 Commander-in-Chief of the Madras Army. Up to 1800 be commanded the troops in the presidency, and for a short time he exercised the civil government as well. In December 1798 he was appointed by Lord Mornington, the governor-general, to command the field army which was intended to attack Tipu Sultan, and in a few months of campaigning Harris reduced the Kingdom of Mysore and stormed the great stronghold of Seringapatam, where the Tipu died in its defence.

He received prize money of £100,000 for the Seringapatam campaign, his success establishing his reputation as a capable and experienced commander, with its political importance leading to his being offered the reward (which he declined) of an Irish peerage. He returned home in 1800, became lieutenant-general in the army the following year, and attained the rank of full general in 1812. He bought Belmont House near Faversham in 1801. In 1809 he was commissioned as Lieutenant-Colonel Commandant of the part-time 2nd East Kent or Lath of Scray and Wingham Regiment of Local Militia.

In 1815 he was made a peer of the United Kingdom under the title Baron Harris, of Seringapatam and Mysore and of Belmont in the County of Kent. In 1820 he was appointed GCB, and in 1824 was made governor of Dumbarton Castle.  He was colonel of the 73rd (Highland) Regiment of Foot from 1800 to his death.

Lord Harris died at Belmont in May 1829. His descendant, the 4th Baron Harris (b. 1851), best known as a cricketer, was Under-Secretary for India (1885–1886), Under-Secretary for war (1886–1889) and Governor of Bombay (1890–1895).

Arms

Notes

References

Attribution:

Further reading
Stephen Rumbold Lushington, Life of Lord Harris (London, 1840), and the regimental histories of the 5th Northumberland Fusiliers and 73rd Highlanders.

External links
 

|-

1746 births
1829 deaths
People educated at Westminster School, London
British Army personnel of the American Revolutionary War
British military personnel of the Fourth Anglo-Mysore War
British military personnel of the Third Anglo-Mysore War
British Army lieutenant generals
Royal Northumberland Fusiliers officers
Kent Militia officers
Peers of the United Kingdom created by George III